Prepiella miniola is a moth in the subfamily Arctiinae. It was described by George Hampson in 1900. It is found in Peru and the Amazon region.

References

Moths described in 1900
Lithosiini